is a seinen manga series by Jun Hayase, serialized in Manga Action. It focuses on the main character, Nakahara Daisuke, as he eats ekiben, bento meals sold at train stations, as he travels around Japan by rail. 

A 12-episode live-action television series adaptation aired between April 5 and June 21, 2012.

Plot
Nakahara Daisuke is the owner of a bento shop in Tokyo and a densha otaku, train enthusiast. For their tenth wedding anniversary, his wife gives him a train ticket for traveling across Japan since he has not had a chance to travel since their honeymoon. She tells him to investigate ekiben recipes along the way to help improve the bento in their shop. Although the trip is intended to be a solo one, Daisuke often befriends other travellers along the way and shares information about trains, railway history, ekiben, meibutsu, and local landmarks. 

At each stop Daisuke or one of his fellow travellers buys an eki-bento (ekiben), and one full page is devoted to an image of the just-opened container with all components labelled; subsequent frames highlight the history and flavors. A related theme is the "romance of train travel".

Major characters
In order of appearance:

 Nakahara Daisuke – the main character, a densha otaku and ekiben enthusiast
 Nakahara Yuko – Daisuke's wife who bought his ticket and sent him on a multiweek trip around Japan
 Ozaki Nana – a journalist for a travel magazine who Daisuke befriends and instructs about ekiben
 Mizukoshi Miki – a law student who has failed the bar exam three times who Daisuke takes under his wing and instructs about sightseeing and ekiben
 Mizukoshi Hiroshi – Miki's nephew, who Daisuke helps fulfill a promise made with his deceased father to ride the Yamaguchi Line steam locomotive and see the Amarube Viaduct
 Kate – an Australian exchange student traveling alone on her summer break

Volumes
Each volume of the manga focuses on a different region of Japan as Daisuke travels from station to station, viewing the local sights and eating tokusanhin in famous ekiben.

Ekiben competition 
In 2011 Hanshin department store in Osaka partnered with Ekiben Hitoritabi to hold an ekiben competition in which 260 ekiben were rated to name the country's best.

References

External links
 

Seinen manga
Cooking in anime and manga
2006 manga
Futabasha manga
Manga adapted into television series
Japanese television dramas based on manga
2012 Japanese television series debuts
2012 Japanese television series endings
Fuji TV
Rail transport in Japan